The American Blimp A-170 is a blimp series built by the American Blimp Corporation now owned and operated by the Airsign Airship Group.

Holden Airship
The Holden Airship (nicknamed "the Holdenberg" by Australian news media) was a promotional gimmick operated by Australian car manufacturer Holden. The lightship was painted in the distinctive red and white livery of Holden and is flown at various outdoor events, such as Tertiary Open Day in Canberra, Australian Capital Territory, on 25 August 2007 (see picture).

In late September 2007, The Holden Airship was decommissioned and flown back on an 22 hour journey to the US.

MZ-3

From 2006 to 2017, a modified A-170 was operated by the United States Navy as an advanced flying laboratory, designated MZ-3A.

Specifications

References

A-170
Twin-engined pusher aircraft
Ducted fan-powered aircraft
Holden